Kevin Nana Yaw Berkoe (born 5 July 2001) is an English professional footballer who plays as a defender for EFL League Two club Salford City.

Berkoe began his career in the youth academies of Chelsea and Wolverhampton Wanderers, before making his professional debut for Oxford United in 2019. He had a loan spell with Oxford City during the same season, and in 2020 joined Salford City following his release.

Career
After playing for Chelsea and Wolverhampton Wanderers as a youth, and having a trial with Sunderland in March 2019, before he signed for Oxford United in May. Upon signing for the club, Oxford manager Karl Robinson described him as "quick, technically very good", and said it was encouraging to have competition for his position. Berkoe made his Oxford debut as a substitute in an EFL Cup first-round tie against Peterborough United on 13 August, and said he was "honoured" to make the step-up to first-team football. On 22 November, Berkoe joined Oxford City on a 28-day loan. On 17 December, he scored his first goal for the club, putting his team 3–2 ahead in an eventual 3–3 draw with bottom of the table St Albans City. and the following week the loan was extended until the end of January 2020. In January 2020, it was extended for a further month.

He was released by Oxford United at the end of the 2019–20 season. He signed with Salford City for the 2020–21 season. On 10 November, Berkoe made his début for Salford in an EFL Trophy group stage match against Rochdale. On 25 September 2021, he moved on loan to National League North team AFC Telford United for one month. Due to several defensive injuries and suspensions, he made his debut the same day, with local newspaper Shropshire Star describing him as one of Telford's "few successes" in a 2–0 defeat to Brackley Town, putting in a "fine display". He was recalled by Salford City on 12 November 2021.

In January 2022 he joined Altrincham on loan for a month.

Career statistics

References

2001 births
Living people
English footballers
Association football defenders
Chelsea F.C. players
Wolverhampton Wanderers F.C. players
Oxford United F.C. players
Oxford City F.C. players
Salford City F.C. players
AFC Telford United players
National League (English football) players
Altrincham F.C. players
English Football League players